The 1998–99 FR Yugoslavia Cup was the seventh season of the FR Yugoslavia's annual football cup. The cup defenders was FK Partizan, but was defeated by Red Star Belgrade in the final.

First round
Thirty-two teams entered in the First Round.

|}
Note: Roman numerals in brackets denote the league tier the clubs participated in the 1998–99 season.

Second round
The 16 winners from the prior round enter this round. The first legs were played on 1 and 2 September and the second legs were played on 22, 23 September and 6 October 1998.
 

|}
Note: Roman numerals in brackets denote the league tier the clubs participated in the 1998–99 season.

Quarter-finals
The eight winners from the prior round enter this round. The first legs were played on 10 October and the second legs were played on 28 and 29 October 1998.

|}

Semi-finals

Final

See also
 1998–99 First League of FR Yugoslavia
 1998–99 Second League of FR Yugoslavia

References

External links
Results on RSSSF

FR Yugoslavia Cup
Cup
Yugo